Hîrjauca is a commune in Călărași District, Moldova with 2,877 inhabitants (2004 census). It is composed of four villages: Hîrjauca, Leordoaia, Mîndra and Palanca.

References

Communes of Călărași District